Johann Peter Eckermann (21 September 1792 – 3 December 1854), German poet and author, is best known for his work Conversations with Goethe, the fruit of his association with Johann Wolfgang von Goethe during the last years of Goethe's life.

Biography
Eckermann was born at Winsen (Luhe) in Harburg, of humble parentage, and was brought up in penury and privation.

After serving as a volunteer in the War of Liberation (1813–1814), he obtained a secretarial appointment under the war department at Hanover. In 1817, although twenty-five years of age, he was enabled to attend the gymnasium of Hanover and afterwards the university of Göttingen, which, however, after one year's residence as a student of law, he left in 1822.

His acquaintance with Goethe began in the following year, when Eckermann sent to Goethe the manuscript of Beiträge zur Poesie (1823). Soon afterwards he went to Weimar, where he supported himself as a private tutor. For several years he also instructed the son of the grand duke. In 1830 he travelled in Italy with Goethe's son. In 1838 he was given the title of grand-ducal councillor and appointed librarian to the grand-duchess.

Writings
Eckermann is chiefly remembered for his important contributions to the knowledge of the great poet contained in his Conversations with Goethe (1836–1848). To Eckermann Goethe entrusted the publication of his Nachgelassene Schriften (posthumous works) (1832–1833). He was also joint-editor with Friedrich Wilhelm Riemer (1774–1845) of the complete edition of Goethe's works in 40 vols (1839–1840). He died at Weimar on 3 December 1854.

Eckermann's Gespräche mit Goethe (vols: i. and ii. 1836; vol. iii. 1848; 7th ed., Leipzig, 1899; best edition by Ludwig Geiger, Leipzig, 1902) have been translated into almost all the European languages, (English translations by Margaret Fuller, Boston, 1839, and John Oxenford, London, 1850).

Besides this work and the Beiträge zur Poesie, Eckermann published a volume of poems (Gedichte, 1838. See J. P. Eckermanns Nachlaß edited by Friedrich Tewes, vol. i. (1905), and an article by RM Meyer in the Goethe-Jahrbuch, xvii. (1896)).

Notes

References
 
Attribution

External links
 

1792 births
1854 deaths
19th-century German poets
19th-century German male writers
German military personnel of the Napoleonic Wars
People from the Electorate of Hanover
Johann Wolfgang von Goethe
German Lutherans
German male poets